The 2017–18 FIU Panthers women's basketball team represents Florida International University during the 2017–18 NCAA Division I women's basketball season. The Panthers, led by second year head coach Tiara Malcom, play their home games at FIU Arena, and are members of Conference USA. They finished the season 8–21, 5–11 in C-USA play to finish in thirteenth place. They failed to qualify for the Conference USA women's tournament.

Roster

Schedule

|-
!colspan=9 style=| Non-conference regular season

|-
!colspan=9 style=| Conference USA regular season

See also
2017–18 FIU Panthers men's basketball team

References

FIU Panthers women's basketball seasons
FIU
FIU Panthers women's basketball
FIU Panthers women's basketball